Breithauptite is a nickel antimonide mineral with the simple formula NiSb. Breithauptite is a metallic opaque copper-red mineral crystallizing in the hexagonal - dihexagonal dipyramidal crystal system. It is typically massive to reniform in habit, but is observed as tabular crystals. It has a Mohs hardness of 3.5 to 4 and a specific gravity of 8.23.

It occurs in hydrothermal calcite veins associated with cobalt–nickel–silver ores.

It was first described in 1840 from the Harz Mountains, Lower Saxony, Germany and in 1845 for occurrences in the Cobalt and Thunder Bay districts of Ontario, Canada. It was named to honor Saxon mineralogist Johann Friedrich August Breithaupt (1791–1873).

See also
List of minerals
List of minerals named after people

References

 Palache, C., H. Berman, and C. Frondel (1944) Dana's system of mineralogy, (7th edition), v. I, pp. 238–239

Antimonide minerals
Nickel minerals
Hexagonal minerals
Minerals in space group 194